Henry Stanford Brown (23 May 1918 – 1963) was an English footballer who played as a half back for various clubs in the 1930s and 1940s, including Wolverhampton Wanderers and Hull City.

Career
He joined Wolverhampton Wanderers in 1938 from Workington, making his debut on 22 April 1939 in a goalless draw at Bolton Wanderers. He played the following game at Leicester City, his only two appearances for the club, before joining Hull City. 
 
After the disruption to league football caused by World War II, he was able to make his Football League debut for Hull in 1946.

References

 

1918 births
1963 deaths
Sportspeople from Workington
English footballers
English Football League players
Workington A.F.C. players
Wolverhampton Wanderers F.C. players
Hull City A.F.C. players
Watford F.C. wartime guest players
Association football midfielders
Footballers from Cumbria